USS LST-388 was a  in the United States Navy during World War II.

Construction and career 
LST-388 was laid down on 20 June 1942 at Newport News Shipbuilding, Newport News, Virginia. Launched on 28 September 1942 and commissioned on 20 November 1942.

During World War II, LST-388 was assigned to the Europe-Africa-Middle theater but later changed to Asiatic-Pacific theater. During the North African occupation, Tunisian operations, she took part from 8 November 1942 to 9 July 1943. She take part in the Sicilian occupation in Italy from 9 to 15 July 1943 and the Salerno landings from 9 to 21 September of the same year.

She then participated in the Invasion of Normandy from 6 to 25 June 1944.

She participated in the Operation Crossroads the atomic bomb tests at Bikini Atoll in July 1946 and took on an important role as a general supply, provisions, hospital, and recreation.

She was decommissioned on 1 February 1947.

Transferred to the United States Maritime Administration to await her fate.

LST-388 was struck from the Navy Register on 25 February 1947 and scrapped by Bethlehem Steel Company on 7 April 1948.

Awards 
LST-388 have earned the following awards:

 American Campaign Medal
 Combat Action Ribbon
 European-Africa-Middle East Campaign Medal (4 battle stars)
 Asiatic-Pacific Campaign Medal
 World War II Victory Medal

Citations

Sources 

 
 
 
 

 

World War II amphibious warfare vessels of the United States
Ships built in Newport News, Virginia
1942 ships
LST-1-class tank landing ships of the United States Navy